Mohamed Bayo (born 4 June 1998) is a professional footballer who plays as a forward for Ligue 1 club Lille. Born in France, he plays for the Guinea national team.

Early life
Bayo was born in Clermont-Ferrand, France, to Guinean parents. They were from a village of Kamikolo Toubaya, Boké Region.

Club career

Early career
In January 2019, Bayo was loaned from Clermont, where he became professional to Dunkerque until the end of the season. On 25 June 2019, Dunkerque extended the loan for the duration of the 2019–20 season.

Clermont
In the 2020–21 season, Bayo helped his hometown club Clermont achieve promotion to Ligue 1 for the first time by finishing as Ligue 2 top scorer with 22 goals.

Lille
On 13 July 2022, Bayo joined Ligue 1 side Lille on a five-year deal.

International career
Born in France, Bayo is of Guinean descent. He debuted with the Guinea national team in a 1–0 2021 Africa Cup of Nations qualification win over Mali on 24 March 2021.

Personal life
In October 2021, Bayo was taken into police custody in France after a hit-and-run following a traffic accident.

Career statistics

Club

International

Scores and results list Guinea's goal tally first, score column indicates score after each Bayo goal.

Honours 
Individual

 Ligue 2 Top Goalscorer: 2020–21: 22 goals
 UNFP Ligue 2 Team of the Year: 2020–21
 UNFP Ligue 2 Player of the Month: February 2020

References

External links
 
 

1998 births
Living people
Footballers from Auvergne-Rhône-Alpes
Citizens of Guinea through descent
Guinean footballers
Guinea international footballers
French footballers
French sportspeople of Guinean descent
Sportspeople from Clermont-Ferrand
Association football forwards
Clermont Foot players
USL Dunkerque players
Lille OSC players
Ligue 1 players
Ligue 2 players
Championnat National players
2021 Africa Cup of Nations players
Black French sportspeople